Harold Dixon may refer to:

 Harold Baily Dixon (1852–1930), British chemist
 Harold Dixon (songwriter), American composer, lyricist and publisher

See also 
 Hal Dixon (disambiguation)